WAAO-LD, virtual channel 40 and UHF digital channel 32, is a low-powered Retro TV-affiliated television station licensed to Andalusia, Alabama, United States. The station is owned by Three Notch Communications, which also operates country music-formatted radio station WAAO-FM.

Although Andalusia is in the Montgomery-Selma DMA, WAAO-LD's signal mainly covers the southernmost reaches of that media market, along with nearby areas of neighboring DMAs. Although the signal does not reach the principal cities of the market areas, they include those served by full-power stations in Dothan, Alabama, the Mobile-Pensacola area, and Panama City, Florida.

Digital channel

References

External links

WAAO-LD Official Webpage

AAO-LD
Retro TV affiliates
Television channels and stations established in 1998
Low-power television stations in the United States
1998 establishments in Alabama